"Heaven Knows" is a song by American rock band the Pretty Reckless from their second studio album, Going to Hell (2014). It was written by Taylor Momsen and Ben Phillips, while Kato Khandwala handled the production. Released on November 19, 2013, as the album's second single, "Heaven Knows" is the band's first single to top a Billboard chart (Mainstream Rock) and their second single to top UK Rock Singles Chart, following their debut single "Make Me Wanna Die" (2010). The song later entered the Alternative Songs chart, peaking at number 20.

Background
Following the end of their worldwide tour The Medicine Tour in 2012, the band began working on their second studio album. They were recording at Water Music Recording Studios in Hoboken, New Jersey, when the studio was destroyed by Hurricane Sandy in October 2012. They lost a lot of equipment and recordings of songs meant for the album and had to do a lot of re-recording. Interscope Records released "Kill Me" to digital retailers on December 2, 2012; it would serve as the album's lead single. However, a conflict with the record company caused the Pretty Reckless to end their deal with Interscope, and on September 24, 2013, it was announced the band had signed on with the label Razor & Tie.

"Heaven Knows" premiered on November 19, 2013, on Sirius XM's Octane, and on the same day, it was released digitally as the album's second single.

Critical reception
Chris Payne of Billboard praised "Heaven Knows" and described it as "Queen's 'We Will Rock You' with Joan Jett vocals". Chucky Eddy of Rolling Stone also praised the song, calling it a "full-on glam [stomp] about troubled teens".

Commercial performance
"Heaven Knows" became the Pretty Reckless' first single to top a Billboard chart. It was their first entry on the Mainstream Rock Songs chart and spent three consecutive weeks at number one, becoming the most successful song of 2014 on the chart. It was the second song by a female-fronted band to top the Mainstream Rock Songs chart in 24 years. After the song's success on US mainstream rock radio stations, it was finally serviced to modern rock radio where it also became the band's first entry on the Alternative Songs chart, peaking at number 20. The song failed to enter the Billboard Hot 100, instead reaching number 14 on the Bubbling Under Hot 100 Singles chart. The song was also the band's first entry on the Canadian Hot 100, peaking at number 48.

The single debuted at number 151 on the UK Singles Chart for the week ending March 1, 2014. It entered the top 100 at number 95 in its third week on the chart, and in its fifth week, it peaked at number 61 with 3,737 copies sold. "Heaven Knows" also became the band's second number-one song on the UK Rock & Metal Singles Chart.

"Heaven Knows" became the band's first song to chart in New Zealand and France, reaching numbers 38 and 158, respectively.

Music video
The music video for "Heaven Knows", co-directed by lead vocalist Taylor Momsen and Jon J, was shot on location in Miami, Florida. Momsen said of the video, "How do you sum up a song that is metaphorically speaking about everyone's life from any general perspective on video? You understate it. We decided to film variations of all of the issues we as a people are facing, whether personal, political or social. We took a lot of shots, each representing some social constant or emotional struggle. Some overt, some subtle, but it's all in there. Everything is thrown at you from the day you're born. Your only chance is to think for yourself... which is not as simple as it sounds."

The video premiered on Vevo on February 13, 2014. It features a half-naked Momsen in black eye shadow, surrounded by burning books and heavily tattooed teenagers in a dark high school.

In popular culture
The song was featured on the soundtrack to the 2017 film American Satan, and was also featured in one of the trailers for the second season of Jessica Jones.

Track listing
Digital download
"Heaven Knows" – 3:44

Charts

Weekly charts

Year-end charts

Certifications

Release history

See also
 List of Billboard Mainstream Rock number-one songs of the 2010s
 List of UK Rock & Metal Singles Chart number ones of 2014

References

2013 singles
2013 songs
Cooking Vinyl singles
The Pretty Reckless songs
Razor & Tie singles
Songs written by Taylor Momsen